Rotterdam University may refer to:

 Rotterdam University of Applied Sciences (NL)
 Erasmus University Rotterdam (NL)